La Chapelle-Naude is a commune in the Saône-et-Loire department in the region of Bourgogne-Franche-Comté in eastern France.

Geography
The Solnan forms the commune's northeastern border.

The Sâne Morte forms part of the commune's southeastern border, flows Northwest through the commune, then forms most of its northwestern border.

See also
Communes of the Saône-et-Loire department

References

Communes of Saône-et-Loire